Alan Lima Cariús, known as Alan Cariús (born 4 April 1997) is a Brazilian professional footballer who plays as a midfielder for Kyoto Sanga.

Club career
He made his debut in the Campeonato Carioca as a pro by Volta Redonda Futebol Clube  on 31 January 2015 in a game against Barra Mansa Futebol Clube.  In May of the same year he was loaned to the Under-20 of the Clube de Regatas do Flamengo, where he returned to Volta Redonda at the end of November 2016. In June 2017 he was loaned to LASK Linz for a season.  In June 2018 followed in the Austrian soccer acting by FC Blau-Weiß Linz.

On 30 October 2019 he agreed to join Austrian club SKN St. Pölten in January 2020.

On 24 July 2021, he joined Saudi Arabian club Al-Adalah.

On 4 August 2022, Alan joined Japanese club Kyoto Sanga.

References

External links

 

1997 births
Sportspeople from Rio de Janeiro (state)
Living people
Brazilian footballers
Association football forwards
Volta Redonda FC players
LASK players
FC Juniors OÖ players
FC Blau-Weiß Linz players
Vila Nova Futebol Clube players
SKN St. Pölten players
Kasımpaşa S.K. footballers
Tuzlaspor players
Al-Adalah FC players
Kyoto Sanga FC players
Austrian Football Bundesliga players
2. Liga (Austria) players
Austrian Regionalliga players
Campeonato Brasileiro Série B players
Saudi First Division League players
J1 League players
Brazilian expatriate footballers
Brazilian expatriate sportspeople in Austria
Expatriate footballers in Austria
Brazilian expatriate sportspeople in Saudi Arabia
Expatriate footballers in Saudi Arabia
Brazilian expatriate sportspeople in Turkey
Expatriate footballers in Turkey
Brazilian expatriate sportspeople in Japan
Expatriate footballers in Japan